John Charles Peace Thompson (14 April 1870 – 31 December 1945) was an English cricketer. Thompson's batting style is unknown. He was born at Chester, Cheshire.

Thompson made a single first-class appearance for Liverpool and District against Yorkshire in 1892 at Aigburth Cricket Ground, Liverpool. In a match which Liverpool and District won by 6 wickets, Thompson batted once, scoring 14 runs in Liverpool and District's first-innings before he was dismissed by Thomas Wardall.

He died at Tarset, Northumberland on 31 December 1945. His brother-in-law Lionel Garnett also played first-class cricket.

References

External links
John Thompson at ESPNcricinfo
John Thompson at CricketArchive

1870 births
1945 deaths
Sportspeople from Chester
English cricketers
Liverpool and District cricketers